Petrus von Hatzfeld (1748 in Münster - 24 April 1823 in Boesfeld, today in Herzebrock-Clarholz) was a German Roman Catholic priest and forty-eighth abbot of Marienfeld Abbey.

1748 births
1823 deaths
German abbots